Yury Kalinin (born 20 January 1953) is a Soviet ski jumper. He competed at the 1972 Winter Olympics and the 1976 Winter Olympics.

References

External links
 

1953 births
Living people
Soviet male ski jumpers
Olympic ski jumpers of the Soviet Union
Ski jumpers at the 1972 Winter Olympics
Ski jumpers at the 1976 Winter Olympics
People from Sortavala
Sportspeople from the Republic of Karelia